Martins Fork is a  river in Bell and Harlan Counties in Kentucky in the United States. The river flows east and north from its source in the Cumberland Mountains, a subrange of the Appalachian Mountains, to its confluence with the Clover Fork at Harlan. The confluence marks the official beginning of the Cumberland River.

See also
Martins Fork Lake
List of rivers of Kentucky

References

Rivers of Kentucky
Tributaries of the Cumberland River
Rivers of Bell County, Kentucky
Rivers of Harlan County, Kentucky